Zixing is a county-level city in Hunan Province, China, it is under the administration of Chenzhou prefecture-level City.

Located on the southeast of the province, it is near to the north of the Chenzhou city proper. The city is bordered to the northwest by Yongxing and Anren Counties, to the northeast by Yanling County, to the east by Guidong County, to the southeast by Rucheng County, to the southwest by Yizhang County, to the west by Suxian District. The city has two subdistricts, nine towns and two townships under its jurisdiction, the government seat is Tangdong Subdistrict.

Administrative divisions
2 subdistricts
 Dongjiang
 Tangdong

9 towns
 Bailang
 Chukou
 Huangcao
 Liaojiang
 Qingjiang
 Sandu
 Tangxi
 Xingning
 Zhoumensi

2 ethnic townships
 Yao Bamianshan
 Yao Huilongshan

Climate

References

External links 

 
Cities in Hunan
County-level divisions of Hunan
Geography of Chenzhou